Radlett railway station is on the Midland Main Line in England, serving the village of Radlett, Hertfordshire. Its three-letter station code is RDT.

The station is served by Thameslink-operated trains on the Thameslink route.

It was built by the Midland Railway in 1868 on its extension to St Pancras. The original intention had been to name the station Aldenham. In the early 20th century, Walter Phillimore, who owned Radlett, built many houses, one of the first "commuter villages".

The station has a PlusBus scheme where train and bus tickets can be bought together for a cheaper price. In Summer 2019 Radlett became part of TfL's Oyster card and contactless payment travel system.

Services
All services at Radlett are operated by Thameslink using  EMUs.

The typical off-peak service in trains per hour is:
 2 tph to  via 

History
The rebuilt station, which used the same box-shaped architectural design as the new station at Bedford, was formally opened on 17 December 1979 by the local MP, Cecil Parkinson.

References

External links

Railway stations in Hertfordshire
DfT Category D stations
Former Midland Railway stations
Railway stations in Great Britain opened in 1868
Railway stations served by Govia Thameslink Railway
Radlett